Shamsuddin Ahmad Chowdhury is a Bangladesh Awami League politician and the former Member of Parliament of Chittagong-16.

Career
Chowdhury was elected to parliament from Chittagong-16 as a Bangladesh Awami League candidate in 1973.

References

Awami League politicians
Living people
1st Jatiya Sangsad members
Year of birth missing (living people)